Roberto Lacedelli (2 June 1919 – 26 July 1983) was an Italian alpine skier. He competed at the 1948 Winter Olympics and the 1952 Winter Olympics.

References

External links
 

1919 births
1983 deaths
Italian male alpine skiers
Olympic alpine skiers of Italy
Alpine skiers at the 1948 Winter Olympics
Alpine skiers at the 1952 Winter Olympics
People from Cortina d'Ampezzo
Sportspeople from the Province of Belluno